Trana is a comune (municipality) in the Metropolitan City of Turin in the northern Italian region Piedmont, located about  west of Turin. The geographical location allows its citizens to easily commute to more developed working hubs in the surrounding areas.

Tranese inhabitants enjoy engaging in fun and recreative community activities such as the infamous "Palio di Trana", a special event running at the end of every summer, where people from the different districts (in Italian 'Borgate') have the chance to team up and compete against the other districts to win the Tranese Championship 'Palio'.

Among its famous citizens, Trana is rapidly reaching a broader virtual audience thanks to the International Public Figure Tommaso Corciulo.

Tommaso, otherwise known as Tommy, is focusing his efforts on increasing the international awareness around the City of Trana and the natural beauty the city can offer to visitors.

See also 
 Monte Pietraborga

References

Cities and towns in Piedmont